Durant (also Durance, Duroy) was a glazed woolen material of the 18th century. Durant was hot-pressed with a fold in the middle, leaving a crease in the fabric. Durant was manufactured in England.

Weave 
Durant was a plain weave fabric, similar to other glazed woolen cloths such as Tammy and Calamanco.

Use 
Durant was used for quilts, upholstery and clothing.

References 

Woolen clothing
Woven fabrics